Christiaan van Pol (14 March 1752 – 21 May 1813) was a flower painter from the Northern Netherlands.

Pol was born in Berkenrode, a small town of about ten Catholic families that is now part of Heemstede. He probably learned to draw in the tavern there known as the Dorstige Kuil, where the artists Simon Fokke, John Greenwood, Jan Punt and others from the Amsterdamse Tekenacademie would meet during the summer months. The historians Roeland van Eynden and Adriaan van der Willigen devoted six pages in their dictionary of artists to him. He first trained in Antwerp where he learned "sieraad schilderen", or decorative painting. Here he met Gerrit Malleyn and Cornelis van Spaendonck and through him, Gerard van Spaendonck and Jan Frans van Dael. He then travelled with them to Paris in 1782 where he at first spent time making decorative arabesques and painting flower arrangements in miniature on snuffbox lids. He became a good friend of Van Dael, who he stayed close to the rest of his life. Like Van Dael, he created oil paintings in the manner of Jan van Huysum, of which his best piece was shown in 1809 and another in 1814. He also made designs for the Gobelins Manufactory and his considered a pupil of Van Dael because of similarities to his work, though he was much older than him. He spent the last years of his life teaching.

Pol died in Paris and Pierre-Louis Dagoty bought his largest flower piece.

References 

 Christiaan van Pol by Hans Krol, Heemstede historian

1752 births
1813 deaths
People from Heemstede
18th-century Dutch painters
18th-century Dutch male artists
Dutch male painters
19th-century Dutch painters
Flower artists
19th-century Dutch male artists